Frontier Communications ILEC Holdings, Inc. is a company created by Verizon Communications in 2009.

History 
The company, sold to Frontier Communications on July 1, 2010, serves as a holding company for former Bell System, Contel, and GTE telephone operating companies that were owned by Verizon prior to July 1, 2010. The company was set up to allow for a Reverse Morris Trust merger, allowing Verizon to spin-off the company to Frontier tax-free. Its primary purpose was to transfer Frontier ILEC Holdings as well as Verizon debt that Frontier was to assume.

Once the purchase was completed, the relevant subsidiary company names were changed to reflect Frontier ownership.

Subsidiary companies 
The company was founded as New Communications ILEC Holdings, Inc. to own the following companies transferred from Verizon and GTE:
Contel of the South
New Communications of the Carolinas (split from Verizon South)
New Communications of the Southwest (split from Verizon California)
Verizon North
Verizon Northwest
Verizon West Coast
Verizon West Virginia (originally part of Bell System)

The company was a part of a subsidiary called New Communications Holdings, Inc., a company that once sold to Frontier was then merged into the company.

References

Frontier Communications
Verizon Communications
Telecommunications companies of the United States
Telecommunications companies established in 2009